Prezid is a small settlement in the hills north of Logatec in the Inner Carniola region of Slovenia. It belongs to the Municipality of Vrhnika.

Name
The name Prezid literally means 'before the wall', referring to the remnants of a Roman wall located in the neighboring settlement of Jerinov Grič.

References

External links
Prezid on Geopedia

Populated places in the Municipality of Vrhnika